Jack Straw is a 1920 American silent comedy film produced by Famous Players-Lasky and distributed by Paramount Pictures. William C. deMille directed the film and Robert Warwick and Carroll McComas star. The film is based on a 1908 stage play by W. Somerset Maugham starring John Drew and a young Mary Boland. Winston Churchill made a cameo appearance in the original film. In 1926 Paramount attempted a remake of this film called The Waiter from the Ritz which was begun and/or completed but never released. James Cruze directed and Raymond Griffith starred; this film, if completed, is now lost. The 1920 film survives at the Library of Congress.

Plot
Based upon a review of the plot in a film publication, Jack Straw (Warwick) is an iceman who becomes a waiter to be closer to the girl (McComas) he is interested in. Later, to impress her, he impersonates an Archduke from Pomerania. A Count from Pomerania (Brower) who is the ambassador arrives and learns of the long-missing son of royalty. The girl's mother (Ashton) learns of the trick being played by Jack. Just when Jack is exposed as being a fraud, it turns out that he is the genuine article. The girl's mother then gladly announces her daughter's engagement to Jack.

Cast
Robert Warwick as Jack Straw
Carroll McComas as Ethel Parker Jennings
Charles Ogle as Mr. Parker Jennings
Irene Sullivan as Mrs. Wanley
Monte du Mont as Ambrose Holland
Frances Parks as Rose
Lucien Littlefield as Sherlo
Robert Brower as Count of Pomerania
Sylvia Ashton as Mrs. Parker Jennings

unbilled
Mayme Kelso (unknown role)

References

External links

Lantern slide 

1920 films
American silent feature films
American films based on plays
Films directed by William C. deMille
Silent American comedy films
1920 comedy films
Famous Players-Lasky films
American black-and-white films
1920s American films